Thomas Hart Benton is a marble sculpture depicting the Senator from Missouri of the same name by Alexander Doyle, installed at the United States Capitol in Washington, D.C., as part of the National Statuary Hall Collection. The statue was gifted by the U.S. state of Missouri in 1899.

References

External links

 

1899 establishments in Washington, D.C.
Marble sculptures in Washington, D.C.
Monuments and memorials in Washington, D.C.
Benton
Sculptures of men in Washington, D.C.